Lee Min-Hee (Korean: 이민희; born 4 February 1980), also spelled as Lee Min-Hui, is a South Korean handball player who competed at the 2008 Summer Olympics. In 2008, she won a bronze medal with the South Korean team.

She married handballer Park Chan-young in 2010.

References

External links
 Official website of the Beijing 2008 Olympic Games

Living people
South Korean female handball players
Olympic handball players of South Korea
Handball players at the 2008 Summer Olympics
Olympic bronze medalists for South Korea
Olympic medalists in handball
Medalists at the 2008 Summer Olympics
Asian Games medalists in handball
Handball players at the 2006 Asian Games
Handball players at the 2010 Asian Games
Asian Games gold medalists for South Korea
Asian Games bronze medalists for South Korea
Medalists at the 2006 Asian Games
Medalists at the 2010 Asian Games
21st-century South Korean women
Year of birth missing (living people)